Daniel King (January 7, 1931 – January 20, 2003) was an American professional basketball player. He played a season for the Baltimore Bullets of the National Basketball Association (NBA).

King was a two-sport star at Western Kentucky University, playing both basketball and baseball for the Hilltoppers from 1951 to 1954 and was inducted into the school's athletic Hall of Fame in 2014. Following his college career, King played one season with the NBA's Bullets, scoring 19 total points in 12 games.

After his basketball career ended, King became a high school coach and administrator. He died on January 20, 2003, in Louisville, Kentucky.

References

1931 births
2003 deaths
American men's basketball players
Baltimore Bullets (1944–1954) players
Forwards (basketball)
High school basketball coaches in the United States
Undrafted National Basketball Association players
Western Kentucky Hilltoppers baseball players
Western Kentucky Hilltoppers basketball players